Gamoon Wala is a village of Muzaffargarh District in the Punjab province of Pakistan. It is 20 km from the city of Muzaffargarh, near Chok Godar.

Dominant tribe and chief 
Dominant tribe is Suhriani a sub-tribe of Baloch tribe. This village was established about 250 years ago when Ghulam Hussain Suhriani migrated here during great Baloch Wars. The most popular chief was Dr. Faiz Bakhsh Khan Suhriani who died in a roadside accident on 29.10.1998.

Population 
Its population is 1,000 people with 49% males and 51% females.

Economy 
Its economy is based on agriculture, business and government jobs. Following crops are grown:
 Wheat
 Cotton
 Rice
 Sugarcane
 Mango
 Date palm
 Sorghum
 Barseem

Education 
Gamoon Wala has one girls' primary school, with an enrollment of 500 students. The school was established in 1989.
Literacy rate is 95% which is higher than any surrounding area.

Infrastructure 
It is linked with fully furnished road. It has bricked streets. Drainage system is up to date. TCF schools which are very advanced and up to date are also near to it and most of the students go there. Super Stores are also established fulfilling the demands of people.
Volleyball, cricket and football is liked by most of the people.

References

Populated places in Muzaffargarh District